Enes Hadžibulić (born December 13, 1981) is a former Macedonian professional basketball Guard. He has been a former sports director at Rabotnicki in season 2018/2019

External links

References

1981 births
Living people
Macedonian men's basketball players
Guards (basketball)
KK Vardar players